The 2016 Men's Queensland Basketball League season was the 31st running of the competition.

The teams for this season were: Brisbane Capitals, Bundaberg Bulls, Cairns Marlins, Gladstone Port City Power, Gold Coast Rollers, Ipswich Force, Logan Thunder, Mackay Meteors, Rockhampton Rockets, South West Metro Pirates, Sunshine Coast Phoenix Clippers, Sunshine Coast Rip, Toowoomba Mountaineers and Townsville Heat.

Team information

Standings

Finals

*The team that finishes 1st overall goes straight through to the semi-finals.

**The top two teams from each pool face-off in the quarter-finals.

QF 1: 1st in Pool A vs. 2nd in Pool A
QF 2: 1st in Pool B vs. 2nd in Pool C
QF 3: 1st in Pool C vs. 2nd in Pool B

Awards

Player of the Week

Coach of the Month

Statistics leaders
Stats as of the end of the regular season

Regular season
 Most Valuable Player: Tanner McGrew (South West Metro Pirates)
 Coach of the Year: Rod Anderson (Townsville Heat)
 U23 Youth Player of the Year: Mirko Djeric (Townsville Heat)
 All-League Team:
 G: Shaun Bruce (Mackay Meteors)
 G: Ray Willis (Gladstone Port City Power)
 F: Tanner McGrew (South West Metro Pirates)
 F: Mitchell Young (Logan Thunder)
 C: Cameron Tragardh (Cairns Marlins)

Finals
 Grand Final MVP: Cameron Tragardh (Cairns Marlins)

Notes

References

External links
 2016 QBL Official Draw
 QBL/SBL Upcoming Seasons
 Big wet cancels all sport, outside and inside
 Rain stops play in men's match after Power surge
 Semi-finals preview
 Grand Final preview
 2016 QBL Grand Final Highlights

2016
2015–16 in Australian basketball
2016–17 in Australian basketball